Totally Hits 2002: More Platinum Hits is an album in the Totally Hits series, reaching #21 on the US Billboard 200 albums chart. The album is RIAA Certified Platinum selling over 1,000,000 copies

Track listing
Pink – "Don't Let Me Get Me" 3:31
Michelle Branch – "All You Wanted" 3:38
P. Diddy featuring Usher and Loon – "I Need a Girl (Part One)" 4:12
Mario – "Just a Friend 2002" 3:36
Usher – "U Don't Have to Call" 3:51
DJ Sammy featuring Yanou – "Heaven (Candlelight Mix)" 4:04
Brandy – "Full Moon" 4:00
Nappy Roots featuring Jazze Pha – "Awnaw" 4:02
Angie Martinez featuring Lil' Mo and Sacario – "If I Could Go!" 4:09
P.O.D. – "Satellite" 3:32
Goo Goo Dolls – "Here Is Gone" 3:58
Justin Guarini – "Get Here" 4:30
BBMak – "Out of My Heart (Into Your Head)" 4:05
Monica – "All Eyez on Me" 3:59
Clipse – "Grindin'" 4:28
The Hives – "Hate to Say I Told You So" 3:22
The Calling – "Adrienne" 4:00
Donell Jones – "You Know That I Love You" 4:19
Boyz II Men – "The Color of Love" 4:35
Ian Van Dahl featuring Marsha – "Castles in the Sky" 3:45

References

Totally Hits
2002 compilation albums